Dilber may refer to:

 Dilber, a Persian given name, which is mostly used in Turkey as well
 Dilber Yunus, also known mononymously as Dilber, Chinese Uyghur opera singer
 Melisa Dilber Ertürk (born 1993), Turkish-Canadian woman footballer
 Dilber, a Turkic surname
 Sıraç Dilber, Turkish scientist
 Suzanna Dilber, Swedish actress